The Blue God is the second studio album by British singer-songwriter Martina Topley-Bird, her first in five years.  Released on 12 May 2008, the album had been complete since at least September 2007. Since then, Topley-Bird slowly revealed track titles and posted songs from the album on her official website and her MySpace page.  The Blue God was produced by Danger Mouse.
The album was preceded by its first single, "Carnies," on 3 March 2008. "Poison," the second single, was released on 5 May 2008.  The single's B-side, "Soldier Boy", is a collaboration with Gorillaz & Roots Manuva which interpolates certain elements of the Gorillaz' demo "Snakes & Ladders". The third single from the album, "Baby Blue," was released as a digital download on 7 September 2008.

The album reached number 88 on the UK Albums Chart in its first week of release.

Track listing

Charts

References

2008 albums
Martina Topley-Bird albums
Independiente Records albums
Albums produced by Danger Mouse (musician)